Corporal Alexander Aberdeen Forman (January 14, 1843March 3, 1922) was an American soldier who fought in the American Civil War. Forman received the country's highest award for bravery during combat, the Medal of Honor, for his action during the Battle of Seven Pines in Virginia on 31 May 1862. He was honored with the award on 17 August 1895.

Biography
Forman was born in Scipio Township, Michigan, on January 14, 1843. He enlisted into the 7th Michigan Infantry. He died on March 3, 1922, and his remains are interred at the Cypress Hills Cemetery in Brooklyn, New York.

Medal of Honor citation

See also

List of American Civil War Medal of Honor recipients: A–F

References

1843 births
1922 deaths
People of Michigan in the American Civil War
Union Army officers
United States Army Medal of Honor recipients
American Civil War recipients of the Medal of Honor